Ray Erskine Parker Jr. (born May 1, 1954) is an American musician, singer, songwriter, and record producer. As a solo performer, he wrote and performed the theme song to the 1984 film Ghostbusters. Previously, Parker achieved a US top-10 hit in 1982 with "The Other Woman". He also performed with his band, Raydio, and with Barry White.

Early life 
Parker was born in Detroit, Michigan, to Venolia Parker and Ray Parker Sr. He has two siblings: his brother Opelton and his sister Barbara. Parker attended Angel Elementary School where his music teacher, Afred T Kirby, inspired him to be a musician at age six playing the clarinet. Parker attended Cass Technical High School in the 10th grade.

Parker is a 1971 graduate of Detroit's Northwestern High School. He was raised in the Dexter-Grand Boulevard neighborhood on its West Side. Parker attended college at Lawrence Institute of Technology.

Music career

Early work 
Parker gained recognition during the late 1960s as a member of Bohannon's house band at the 20 Grand nightclub. This Detroit hotspot often featured Tamla/Motown acts, one of which, the (Detroit) Spinners, was so impressed by the young guitarist's skills that they added him to their touring group. Through the Bohannon relationship, he recorded and co-wrote his first songs at age 16 with Marvin Gaye. Parker was also employed as a studio musician as a teenager for the emergent Holland-Dozier-Holland's Invictus/Hot Wax stable, and his "choppy" style was especially prominent on "Want Ads", a number one single for Honey Cone. Parker was later enlisted by Lamont Dozier to appear on his first two albums for ABC Records.

In 1972, Parker was a guest guitarist on Stevie Wonder's funk song "Maybe Your Baby", from Wonder's album Talking Book, an association which prompted a permanent move to Los Angeles. He also was the lead guitarist for Wonder when Wonder served as the opening act on the Rolling Stones' 1972 tour. In 1973, he became a sideman in Barry White's Love Unlimited Orchestra. Parker appeared briefly in the 1974 film Uptown Saturday Night as a guitar player in the church picnic scene.

Parker also wrote songs and did session work for the Carpenters, Bill Cosby, Rufus and Chaka Khan, the Supremes, Aretha Franklin, Deniece Williams, Bill Withers, Michael Henderson, Jean-Luc Ponty, Leon Haywood, the Temptations, Boz Scaggs, David Foster, Rhythm Heritage, Gladys Knight & the Pips, Herbie Hancock, Tina Turner, and Diana Ross.

Parker's first bona fide hit as a writer was "You Got the Love", co-written with Chaka Khan and recorded by Rufus. The single hit No. 1 on the R&B charts and No. 11 on the pop charts in December 1974. In 1976, he featured as rhythm guitarist on Lucio Battisti's album Io tu noi tutti, translated as "Me you and all of us".

1977–1981: Raydio 
In 1977, Parker created the R&B group Raydio with Vincent Bonham, Jerry Knight, and Arnell Carmichael. Raydio scored their first big hit with "Jack and Jill", from their 1978 self-titled album with Arista Records. The song reached No. 8 on the Billboard Hot 100 chart, earning a Gold single and Gold album in the process. Their follow-up hit, "You Can't Change That", was released in 1979 from the Rock On album. The song was another Top 10 hit, peaking at No. 9 on the Billboard chart during the summer and selling a million copies.

In 1980, the group became known as Ray Parker Jr. and Raydio. The group released two more albums: Two Places at the Same Time in 1980 and A Woman Needs Love in 1981, both Gold albums. In 1981, Parker produced the hard funk single "Sweat (Till You Get Wet)" by Brick. During the 1980s, Ray Parker Jr. and Raydio had two Top 40 hits: "Two Places at the Same Time" (No. 30 in 1980) and "That Old Song" (No. 21 in 1981). Their last and biggest hit, "A Woman Needs Love (Just Like You Do)", released in 1981, went to No. 4 on the Billboard Hot 100 and to No. 1 on the R&B Chart for two weeks that year.

Solo years 
Raydio broke up in 1981. Parker continued with his solo career, scoring eight Top 40 hits, including the hit single "The Other Woman" (Pop No. 4) in 1982 and "Ghostbusters" in 1984. "Ghostbusters" peaked at No. 1 for three weeks on Billboard'''s Hot 100 chart, and at No. 1 for two weeks on its Black Singles chart. The song was also nominated for an Academy Award for Best Original Song in 1984, but lost to Stevie Wonder's "I Just Called to Say I Love You" from The Woman in Red. Parker's song secured him a 1984 Grammy Award for Best Pop Instrumental Performance. Other hits from this period included "I Still Can't Get Over Loving You" (Pop No. 12) and "Jamie" (Pop No. 14).

Parker also wrote and produced hits for New Edition ("Mr. Telephone Man"), Randy Hall, Cheryl Lynn ("Shake It Up Tonight"), Deniece Williams ("I Found Love"), and Diana Ross. He performed guitar on several songs on La Toya Jackson's 1980 debut album. In 1989, Run-D.M.C. performed a rap for the movie Ghostbusters II that contained elements of Parker's 1984 hit. 1989 also saw Parker work with actor Jack Wagner (General Hospital) on an album for MCA Records that was eventually shelved and never released. A single from the Wagner sessions, "Wish You Were Mine", featuring an intro rap by Parker, was released on a 1990 MCA promotional sampler CD.

In 2006, Parker released a new CD titled I'm Free. In 2014, he was invited by producer Gerry Gallagher to record with Latin rock musicians El Chicano, as well as Alphonse Mouzon, Brian Auger, Alex Ligertwood, Siedah Garrett, Walfredo Reyes Jr., Spencer Davis, Lenny Castro, Vikki Carr, Pete Escovedo, Peter Michael Escovedo, Jessy J, Marcos J. Reyes, Salvador Santana, and David Paich. In July 2016, Parker performed on the ABC network's television show Greatest Hits.

Parker is also the founder and owner of the Los Angeles-based recording facility Ameraycan Recording Studios.

In 2022, Parker competed in season eight of The Masked Singer as "Sir Bug a Boo". After being eliminated on "Fright Night" alongside the forfeiting of Linda Blair as "Scarecrow", he performed the Ghostbusters theme.

 Ghostbusters theme song lawsuit 
In 1984, Huey Lewis sued Columbia Pictures and Parker, stating that the melody to the Ghostbusters theme song infringed on the copyright of the Huey Lewis and the News song "I Want a New Drug", which had been released on their album Sports the previous year. The three parties reached a settlement in 1995 which forbade them from revealing any information that was not included in a press release they jointly issued at the time. In March 2001, Parker filed a suit against Lewis for breaching the part of the settlement which prohibited either side from speaking about it publicly.

 Music videos 
Parker was one of the first black artists to venture into the then-fledgling world of music videos. In 1978, Hollywood producer Thom Eubank produced several music videos of songs from Raydio's first, eponymous album on Arista Records. The single "Jack & Jill" was the first released to air on Wolfman Jack's Saturday night television show, The Midnight Special. The music videos were also transferred to film and projected in movie theaters all over Europe. He also made two different videos for his hit "The Other Woman". The first was Halloween-themed and centered around a haunted castle with dancing corpses and vampires. The second was more performance-oriented, with Parker performing the song against an outer space background with backup singers. Parker's "Ghostbusters" video, helmed by the film's director, Ivan Reitman, was one of the first movie-themed videos to find success on MTV.

 Acting 
In addition to Uptown Saturday Night, Parker also made acting appearances on the 1980s sitcom Gimme a Break, 1984 CBS Saturday morning kids' show Pryor's Place (for which Parker appeared in the opening title sequence singing the theme song), two episodes of Berrenger's (1985), Charlie Barnett's Terms of Enrollment (1986) (V) aka Terms of Enrollment (USA: short title), Disorderlies (1987), Enemy Territory (1987).  He was also a production assistant for the film Fly by Night (1993). He made guest appearances on 21 Jump Street and Kids Incorporated. In early 2009, Parker appeared in a television advertisement for 118 118, a British directory enquiries provider. This featured Parker singing a 118-specific version of the Ghostbusters theme song.

On April 15, 2009, Parker's 118 theme song was made available as a downloadable ringtone from the 118 118 mobile website. In 2014, Parker appeared in the fifth episode of the first season of NBC's romantic comedy television series A to Z, singing the "Ghostbusters" theme song for a Halloween party. Parker was highlighted on TV One's series Unsung, in the fifth season.

 Discography For Ray Parker Jr.'s releases with Raydio, see Raydio discography.''

Solo studio albums

Compilation albums

Solo singles

References

External links 

 
 
 
 SoulTracks.com profile of Ray Parker Jr.
 Ray Parker Jr. Live interview on Soul Patrol.net Radio August 2006
 Ray Parker Jr 2012 Audio Interview at Soulinterviews.com
Ray Parker Jr. NAMM Oral History Program Interview (2015)

 
1954 births
Living people
20th-century American guitarists
African-American Christians
African-American guitarists
African-American male singers
African-American record producers
African-American songwriters
American bandleaders
American baritones
American funk guitarists
American male guitarists
American rhythm and blues guitarists
American session musicians
American soul guitarists
Grammy Award winners
Guitarists from Detroit
Northwestern High School (Michigan) alumni
Record producers from Michigan
Singers from Detroit
Songwriters from Michigan
The Funk Brothers members
The Love Unlimited Orchestra members